Golf became part of the Pan American Games for the first time at the 2015 Games in Toronto, Canada. The Games had an individual event for each gender and a mixed-team competition. In the latter, the low female and low male score each day counted toward the team total.

Colombia swept all three gold medals at the first edition.

Results

Men's individual

Women's individual

Mixed team

Medal table

References

 
Sports at the Pan American Games
Pan American Games
Pan American Games
Pan American Games